Andrew Harris and Nick Kyrgios were the defending champions, but Harris was no longer eligible to compete in junior tennis, and thus could not defend his title.

Kyrgios and Thanasi Kokkinakis defeated Enzo Couacaud and Stefano Napolitano in the final, 6–2, 6–3 to win the boys' doubles tennis title at the 2013 Wimbledon Championships. The pair of Kyrgios and Kokkinakis would go on to win the men's doubles event at the 2022 Australian Open.

Seeds

  Kyle Edmund /  Frederico Ferreira Silva (semifinals)
  Maxime Hamou /  Johan Tatlot (second round)
  Christian Garín /  Nicolás Jarry (withdrew)
  Pedro Cachín /  Guillermo Núñez (first round)
  Yoshihito Nishioka /  Jorge Panta (quarterfinals)
  Clément Geens /  Noah Rubin (quarterfinals)
  Naoki Nakagawa /  Gianluigi Quinzi (first round)
  Harry Bourchier /  Alexander Zverev (withdrew)

Draw

Finals

Top half

Bottom half

References

External links

Boys' Doubles
Wimbledon Championship by year – Boys' doubles